In Your House 14: Revenge of the 'Taker was the 14th In Your House professional wrestling pay-per-view (PPV) event produced by the World Wrestling Federation (WWF, now WWE). The event took place on April 20, 1997, at the Rochester Community War Memorial in Rochester, New York. Five matches were shown on the PPV portion of the event. There were also two dark matches and one match for the Free for All pre-show.

In the main event, Stone Cold Steve Austin fought Bret Hart. The undercard included The Undertaker defending the WWF Championship against Mankind, Rocky Maivia defending the WWF Intercontinental Championship against Savio Vega, and Owen Hart and The British Bulldog defending the WWF Tag Team Championship against The Legion of Doom (Hawk and Animal).

Production

Background
In Your House was a series of monthly pay-per-view (PPV) shows first produced by the World Wrestling Federation (WWF, now WWE) in May 1995. They aired when the promotion was not holding one of its then-five major PPVs (WrestleMania, King of the Ring, SummerSlam, Survivor Series, and Royal Rumble), and were sold at a lower cost. In Your House 14: Revenge of the 'Taker took place on April 20, 1997, at the Rochester Community War Memorial in Rochester, New York. The name of the show was based on the rivalry between The Undertaker and Mankind the build to this rivalry was called Revenge of the Darkness Originally before he had his knee injury Wildman Marc Mero was Original opponent for The Undertaker .

Storylines

The main feud heading into In Your House 14 was between Stone Cold Steve Austin and Bret Hart. Their rivalry began in 1996 after Austin won the 1996 King of the Ring tournament and began taunting Hart, who was inactive at the time. Austin insulted Hart in his speeches so Hart could accept his challenge to a match. Hart returned in October and accepted Austin's challenge, with the two facing each other at Survivor Series where Hart defeated Austin. Their rivalry continued as Hart and Austin were the final two participants in the 1997 Royal Rumble match. Hart had originally eliminated Austin from the match but Austin's elimination was considered unofficial as the officials had not seen it because they were busy in a brawl between eliminated wrestlers Mankind and Terry Funk. They were participants in a Four Corners Elimination match for the vacant WWF Championship at In Your House 13: Final Four, which Hart won. The next night on Raw, Austin cost Hart the WWF Championship against Sycho Sid when Hart had applied the Sharpshooter on Sid, Austin nailed Hart with a steel chair followed by Sid powerbombing Hart for the win. Hart and Austin were booked to wrestle in a no disqualification submission match at WrestleMania, but Hart got a shot at the WWF Championship in a steel cage match on the March 17 edition of Raw Is War, with the winner defending the title against The Undertaker at WrestleMania 13. Hart had almost the match won, until Undertaker interfered and helped Sid in getting the victory. At WrestleMania 13, Hart faced Austin in a No Disqualification Submission match where he applied the Sharpshooter on Austin in the end of the match. Austin was heavily bleeding and passed out. Hart won the match but he did not release the hold. It resulted in a double turn, as Hart turned heel and Austin turned babyface. Hart then was booked to face Sid at In Your House, but during the April 7 episode of Raw Is War, Sid no-showed and Austin volunteered to face Sid's scheduled opponent, Mankind, if Austin faced Hart at In Your House. Hart then reformed the Hart Foundation by recruiting Owen Hart and The British Bulldog. Brian Pillman joined on April 21 and Jim Neidhart joined on April 28. The entire faction feuded with Austin.

The other feud heading into the event was between The Undertaker and Mankind. On the April 1, 1996, edition of Monday Night Raw, Undertaker faced Justin Bradshaw in the main event where Mankind interfered and attacked Undertaker, thus disqualifying Bradshaw in the process. At King of the Ring, Mankind defeated Undertaker in their first encounter. Mankind invented the Boiler Room Brawl match and the first-ever Boiler Room Brawl took place at SummerSlam, which Mankind won after Undertaker's manager Paul Bearer betrayed him. Undertaker invented a Buried Alive match and the first-ever Buried Alive match took place at In Your House 11: Buried Alive, which Undertaker won. They faced each other in a normal one fall match at Survivor Series, which Undertaker won. On the March 31 edition of Raw is War, Bearer asked WWF Champion Undertaker to forgive him and take him back as his manager but Undertaker refused to do so. Mankind came out and attacked Undertaker, while former champion Sid saved Undertaker. This led to a match between Undertaker and Mankind at In Your House 14.

Event

Before the event aired on pay-per-view, The Sultan (originally The Stalker) defeated Flash Funk at Free for All. 

The actual pay-per-view opened with Owen Hart and British Bulldog defending the WWF Tag Team Championship against the Legion of Doom (Hawk and Animal). LOD appeared to have won the match when they pinned Bulldog after a Doomsday Device, but the match continued because Owen was the legal man in the ring. In the end, Bret Hart attacked the referee, causing Owen and Bulldog to be disqualified. As titles cannot change hands via disqualification, Owen and Bulldog retained their title. 

After that, Rocky Maivia defended the WWF Intercontinental Championship against Savio Vega, who was supported by his stable, the Nation of Domination (NOD). During the match, NOD member Crush interfered and hit Maivia with a Heart Punch outside the ring. Maivia was counted-out and lost the match but remained champion, as titles cannot change hands via countout. After the match, the entire NOD attacked Maivia until Ahmed Johnson came out with a wooden board and cleared the ring.

In the third match, "Double J" Jesse James pinned Rockabilly with a small package. 

Next, The Undertaker defended the WWF Championship against his nemesis, Mankind. Undertaker hit Mankind with a Tombstone Piledriver and pinned him to retain his title. He then chased Mankind's manager, Paul Bearer, and beat both, finally shooting a fireball into Bearer's face. 

In the main event Stone Cold Steve Austin fought Bret Hart. During the match, British Bulldog ran in and hit Austin with a steel chair. Austin won the match by disqualification, but Bret, Owen and Bulldog all continued to attack Austin. Bret tried to hit Austin with the ring bell, but Austin instead blocked the bell to hit Hart. Austin then hit Bret with a chair, targeting his knee and then applied the Sharpshooter until the officials pulled him off. Bret, Owen and Bulldog retreated from the ring while Austin celebrated his victory.

Aftermath
Stone Cold Steve Austin continued his feud with The Hart Foundation. On the May 26, 1997 episode of Raw, Austin and Shawn Michaels defeated Owen Hart and The British Bulldog for the WWF Tag Team Championship. However, Michaels was injured and they vacated the titles on the July 14 episode of Raw. The rivalry ended at In Your House 16: Canadian Stampede when a team captained by Austin lost a five-on-five tag team match against the Hart Foundation.

Results

References

External links
In Your House 14: Revenge of the 'Taker results at Online World of Wrestling

14: Revenge of the 'Taker
Events in New York (state)
Professional wrestling in New York (state)
1997 in sports in New York (state)
1997 WWF pay-per-view events
April 1997 events in the United States
The Undertaker